The Trier Imperial Baths (German: Kaiserthermen) are a large Roman bath complex in Trier, Germany. The complex was constructed in the early 4th century AD, during the reign of Constantine I. During that time, Trier was a major imperial hub, being a primary residence for Constantine's son Crispus. The baths were built around hot water pools reaching 40°C. Underneath the complex was a network of underground passageways used by the staff which can still be seen today, along with the remains of the sewer system. However, the baths were never completed and were made into a castle in the Middle Ages.

History

Roman Period
Constantius Chlorus initiated construction of the baths shortly before 300 C.E. and construction ceased around 316 C.E. with the baths still incomplete. Like Imperial baths found in Rome, such as the Baths of Caracalla or the Baths of Trajan, the Trier Imperial Baths were divided into two parts, the thermae and the palaestra. The palaestra measures 160 by 130 meters, while the main bath building is west of these exercise grounds.

Later Uses

Current Remains

Gallery

See also
Forum baths
Barbara Baths
List of Roman public baths

External links

References

Ancient Roman baths
Ancient Roman buildings and structures in Germany
Buildings and structures in Trier
History of Trier
World Heritage Sites in Germany